Carl Friedrich Christian Mohs (29 January 1773 – 29 September 1839) was a German chemist and mineralogist. He was the creator of the Mohs scale of mineral hardness. Mohs also introduced a classification of the crystal forms in crystal systems independently of Christian Samuel Weiss.

Early life 
Mohs was born in Gernrode, in the Harz mountains Germany. He showed a clear interest in science at an early age and received private education before entering the University of Halle.

Education 
Mohs studied chemistry, mathematics and physics at the University of Halle. In 1798 he joined the Mining Academy in Freiberg, Saxony, being student of Abraham Gottlob Werner.

Career 
After assuming the position of a foreman at a mine in 1801, Mohs moved in 1802 to Austria, where he was employed in trying to identify the minerals in a private collection of the banker J. F. van der Nüll. Mohs described this collection, a catalogue was printed and published. In 1812 he moved to Graz where he was employed by Archduke Johann in his newly established museum and science academy, which was subsequently divided into the Joanneum and the Graz University of Technology. In 1818 Mohs was appointed successor of his former professor at the Freiberg Mining Academy A. G. Werner, who died in 1817. In 1826 Mohs became full professor of mineralogy at the University of Vienna.  At the same time he was assigned curator of the Imperial Mineralogical Collection, in which the van der Nüll collection of minerals was incorporated in 1827.  In 1835 Mohs resigned. He became Bergrath which meant being an imperial counselor in charge of mining affairs, published under orders from his department an instruction on mining and was commissioned with the establishment of a montanistic museum in Vienna.

Mineral properties 

As part of this task, he started classifying minerals by their physical characteristics, instead of their chemical composition, as had been done traditionally.  This emphasis on physical characteristics was at odds with the prevailing chemical systematics. However, both Theophrastus and Pliny the Elder had compared the relative hardness of minerals known to them in the ancient world, including diamond and quartz. They knew that diamond could scratch quartz, so showing it to be harder. This became the basis of the hardness scale developed by Mohs. The hardest mineral, diamond was given a value of 10 and softer minerals such as talc were given the very low value of 1 (unity). Other minerals were given intermediate values, depending on their ability to scratch another mineral in the scale. Thus gypsum was given the value 2 because it will scratch talc crystals, and calcite the value 3 because it will scratch gypsum. Minerals are also now classified by chemical characteristics, but the physical properties are still useful in field examination.

In 1812, Mohs became a professor in Graz. 
In 1818, Mohs was appointed professor at his alma mater in Freiberg. 
In 1826, Mohs was a Professor in Vienna.

Personal life 
In 1816, Mohs settled in Vienna where he enjoyed balloons. In 1818, Mohs moved to Freiberg, Saxony. Mohs died during a trip to Agordo, Italy in 1839, at the age of 66.

See also 
 Mohs scale of mineral hardness

Notes

References
 
 Wilhelm von Gümbel: Mohs, Friedrich. In: Allgemeine Deutsche Biographie. Band 22, Duncker & Humblot, Leipzig 1885, S. 76–79.
 Josef Zemann: Mohs Friedrich, Montanist, Mineraloge und Kristallograph. In: Österreichisches Biographisches Lexikon 1815–1950 (ÖBL). Band 6, Verlag der Österreichischen Akademie der Wissenschaften, Wien 1975, S. 345.
 Friedrich Mohs. In: Austria-Forum
 Johannes Uray, Chemische Theorie und mineralogische Klassifikationssysteme von der chemischen Revolution bis zur Mitte des 19. Jahrhunderts. In: Berhard Hubmann, Elmar Schübl, Johannes Seidl (eds.), Die Anfänge geologischer Forschung in Österreich. Beiträge zur Tagung „10 Jahre Arbeitsgruppe Geschichte der Erdwissenschaften Österreichs" von 24. bis 26. April 2009 in Graz. Graz 2010, S. 107–25.

External links 

19th-century German geologists
German mineralogists
19th-century Austrian geologists
Austrian mineralogists
Burials at the Vienna Central Cemetery
1773 births
1839 deaths
Honorary Fellows of the Royal Society of Edinburgh
Academic staff of the Freiberg University of Mining and Technology